The Star Flight Starfire is the first aircraft in a large family of American ultralight aircraft that was designed by Dick Turner and produced by Star Flight Manufacturing, introduced in 1979. The aircraft were all supplied as kits for amateur construction.

Design and development
The line of aircraft all feature a cable-braced high-wing, a single-seat, open cockpit, tricycle landing gear and a single engine in pusher configuration.

The aircraft is made from bolted-together aluminium tubing, with the flying surfaces covered in Dacron sailcloth. Its  span wing is cable-braced from a single element kingpost. The landing gear features a steerable nose wheel with a bicycle-style rim brake. The powerplant is mounted underneath the wing and drives a pusher propeller.

The Tristar model took 25 hours to build from the factory-supplied assembly kit.

Variants
Starfire
Initial model with a hybrid weight-shift and aerodynamic control system, designed in 1979.
Tristar
Model designed in 1980, with a conventional three-axis aerodynamic control system, using a side stick and spoilers for roll control. Revised fuselage for new control system. The standard engine supplied was the  Cuyuna 430R.
TX-1000
Model with a conventional three-axis aerodynamic control system, strengthened airframe and a  Rotax 377 two-stroke engine.
SC-1000
Improved model
AC-2000
Improved model introduced in 1984.

Specifications (Tristar)

References

External links
Photo of Tristar
Photo of Tristar

1970s United States ultralight aircraft
Homebuilt aircraft
Single-engined pusher aircraft